The Trinovantēs (Common Brittonic: *Trinowantī) or Trinobantes were one of the Celtic tribes of Pre-Roman Britain.  Their territory was on the north side of the Thames estuary in current Essex, Hertfordshire and Suffolk, and included lands now located in Greater London. They were bordered to the north by the Iceni, and to the west by the Catuvellauni. Their name possibly derives from the Celtic intensive prefix "tri-" and a second element which was either "nowio" – new, so meaning "very new" in the sense of "newcomers", but possibly with an applied sense of vigorous or lively ultimately meaning "the very vigorous people". Their capital was Camulodunum (modern Colchester), one proposed site of the legendary Camelot.

Shortly before Julius Caesar's invasion of Britain in 55 and 54 BC, the Trinobantes were considered the most powerful tribe in Britain. At this time their capital was probably at Braughing (in modern-day Hertfordshire). In some manuscripts of Caesar's Gallic War their king is referred to as Imanuentius, although in other manuscripts no name is given. Some time before Caesar's second expedition this king was overthrown by Cassivellaunus, who is usually assumed to have belonged to the Catuvellauni. Imanuentius's son, Mandubracius, fled to the protection of Caesar in Gaul. During his second expedition Caesar defeated Cassivellaunus and restored Mandubracius to the kingship, and Cassivellaunus undertook not to molest him again. Tribute was also agreed.

The next identifiable king of the Trinovantes, known from numismatic evidence, was Addedomarus, who took power c. 20–15 BC, and moved the tribe's capital to Camulodunum. For a brief period c. 10 BC Tasciovanus of the Catuvellauni issued coins from Camulodunum, suggesting that he conquered the Trinobantes, but he was soon forced to withdraw, perhaps as a result of pressure from the Romans, as his later coins no longer bear the mark "Rex", and Addedomarus was restored.  Addedomarus was briefly succeeded by his son Dubnovellaunus c. 10–5 BC, but a few years later the tribe was finally conquered by either Tasciovanus or his son Cunobelinus. Addedomarus, Dubnovellaunus and possibly Mandubracius all appear in later, post-Roman and medieval British Celtic genealogies and legends as Aedd Mawr (Addedo the Great) Dyfnwal Moelmut (Dubnovellaunus the Bald and Silent) and Manawydan. The Welsh Triads recall Aedd Mawr as one of the founders of Britain.

The Trinobantes reappeared in history when they participated in Boudica's revolt against the Roman Empire in 60 AD. Their name was given to one of the civitates of Roman Britain, whose chief town was Caesaromagus (modern Chelmsford, Essex). The style of their rich burials (see facies of Aylesford) is of continental origin and evidence of their affiliation to the Belgic people. Their name was re-used as Trinovantum, the supposed original name of London, by Geoffrey of Monmouth in his largely fictional Historia Regum Britanniae, in which he claimed the name derived from Troi-novantum or "New Troy", connecting this with the legend that Britain was founded by Brutus and other refugees from the Trojan War.

Popular culture
In Chelmsford 123, a British television situation comedy produced for Channel 4 by Hat Trick Productions, the main character of Badvoc (played by Rory McGrath) was the leader of The Trinovantes.

References

Julius Caesar, De Bello Gallico
Caesar Augustus, Res Gestae Divi Augusti
Tacitus, Annals
Geoffrey of Monmouth, Historia Regum Britanniae

External links

Trinovantes at Roman-Britain.co.uk
Trinovantes at Romans in Britain

Celtic Britons
Tribes involved in Julius Caesar's invasions of Britain
Roman Colchester
Historical Celtic peoples
Roman client kingdoms in Britain